Krasnaya Pad is a rural locality (a settlement) in Rabochy posyolok Magdagachi of Magdagachinsky District, Amur Oblast, Russia. The population was 15 as of 2018.

Geography 
The village is located 15 km from Magdagachi.

References 

Rural localities in Magdagachinsky District